Juan Miguel Miranda Ramírez (born April 25, 1983) is a Cuban former first baseman. He played in Major League Baseball (MLB) for the New York Yankees and the Arizona Diamondbacks and in Nippon Professional Baseball (NPB) for the Hokkaido Nippon-Ham Fighters.

Listed at 6' 0" , 220 lb. , Miranda bats and throws left handed. He was born in Consolación del Sur, Pinar del Río Province.

Baseball career

Cuba
In addition, he was included on the  Cuban national team.

Miranda defected to the Dominican Republic in early 2004, on his seventh attempt. He established residency in 2005, and was granted citizenship there in 2006.

Professional career

New York Yankees
Miranda signed a four-year contract with the New York Yankees worth $2 million on December 12, . He spent the  season with their Single-A affiliate Tampa Yankees and Double-A Trenton Thunder. In , he was promoted to Triple-A Scranton Wilkes-Barre Yankees.

On September 16, Miranda was called up by the Yankees for the first time in his career. He made his major league debut on September 18, 2008. His first major league plate appearance resulted in a walk. He was called up again briefly in April 2009, as a replacement for David Robertson.

Miranda recorded a walk-off game-winning single against the Kansas City Royals on September 29, 2009. He hit his first Major League home run on October 2, 2009 against the Tampa Bay Rays.

Arizona Diamondbacks
On November 18, 2010, Miranda was traded to the Arizona Diamondbacks for minor leaguer Scott Allen. In 65 games for Arizona, Miranda batted .213/.315/.402 with seven home runs and 23 RBI. On July 15, 2011, Miranda was outrighted off of the roster and assigned to the Triple-A Reno Aces.

Tampa Bay Rays
On December 6, 2011, Miranda signed a minor league contract with the Tampa Bay Rays, which included an invitation to spring training. On June 9, 2012, he was released while playing for the Triple-A Durham Bulls.

Vaqueros Laguna
On June 27, 2012, Miranda signed with the Vaqueros Laguna of the Mexican League. He hit four home runs with 17 RBI and a torrid batting line of .423/.528/.676 in 20 games. He remained with the club in 2013, playing in 107 games with a batting line of .367/.498/.633 with 26 home runs and 86 RBI.

Hokkaido Nippon-Ham Fighters
On October 30, 2013, Miranda signed with the Hokkaido Nippon-Ham Fighters of Nippon Professional Baseball. On the season, Miranda hit for an average of .227 in 116 games with 42 walks and 14 home runs, but struck out 108 times in 427 plate appearances.

Vaqueros Laguna
On April 2, 2015, returned to the Vaqueros Laguna for the 2015 season, and hit 13 home runs with 17 RBI and a batting line of .315/.468/.486 in 101 contests. He was a LMB All-Star in 2015.

Diablos Rojos del México
On January 14, 2016, Miranda was traded to the Diablos Rojos del México of the Mexican League.

Guerreros de Oaxaca
Miranda was then traded to the Guerreros de Oaxaca of the Mexican League on February 17, 2016. On April 21, 2016, he was released by Oaxaca.

Saraperos de Saltillo
On May 17, 2016, Miranda signed with the Saraperos de Saltillo of the Mexican League. He was released on July 15, 2016.

Bravos de León
Miranda signed with the Bravos de León of the Mexican League on May 30, 2017. He was released on July 1, 2017.

See also
List of baseball players who defected from Cuba

References

External links

, or MiLB, or Baseball Reference (Cuban, Fall, Japanese, Mexican, Minor and Winter Leagues), or Cuban Baseball, or Retrosheet, or Venezuelan Winter League

1983 births
Living people
Arizona Diamondbacks players
Defecting Cuban baseball players
Cuban expatriate baseball players in Japan
People from Consolación del Sur
Durham Bulls players
Guerreros de Oaxaca players
Hokkaido Nippon-Ham Fighters players
Major League Baseball first basemen
Major League Baseball players from Cuba
Cuban expatriate baseball players in the United States
Navegantes del Magallanes players
Cuban expatriate baseball players in Venezuela
Peoria Javelinas players
New York Yankees players
Reno Aces players
Saraperos de Saltillo players
Tampa Yankees players
Tigres del Licey players
Cuban expatriate baseball players in the Dominican Republic
Trenton Thunder players
Scranton/Wilkes-Barre Yankees players
Vaqueros Laguna players
Vegueros de Pinar del Rio players
Yaquis de Obregón players
Cuban expatriate baseball players in Mexico
Bravos de León players